Kateryna Gornostai (Ukrainian: Горностай Катерина Павлівна; born March 15, 1989) is a Ukrainian film director, screenwriter and film editor. She is a jury member of the film festival Wiz-Art since 2014 and a member of the Ukrainian Film Academy since 2017.

Biography 
Kateryna Gornostai was born in Lutsk, Volyn Oblast on March 15, 1989. She was the only child of psychotherapists Svetlana Vaskivska and Pavel Gornostay.

Education 
First, Kateryna studied biology (2010) and later Journalism (2012, MD) at the National University of Kyiv-Mohyla Academy. Having graduated from the Marina Razbezhkina and Mikhail Ugarov's Documentary Film and Theatre in Moscow from October 2012 to November 2013, she returned home to Kyiv.

Film career 

Kateryna Gornostai started her career as a documentary filmmaker in 2012. She is currently working on educational documentaries as well as her own documentary and fiction film projects. Kateryna also teaches documentary filmmaking at Kyiv-Mohyla Academy's School of Journalism. She began to experiment with fiction films and hybrid forms. Her aesthetic and ability to convey life without artificiality have caught the attention of film critics.

Filmography

Awards

See also 

 55th Karlovy Vary International Film Festival
 List of LGBT-related films of 2021

References 

1989 births
Living people
People from Lutsk
Ukrainian women film directors
Women screenwriters
Women film editors